Ernest T. Jones (born January 18, 1970) is an American football coach.  He was briefly running backs coach for the University of Connecticut Huskies football team.  He was head football coach at Alcorn State University. He was named the head football coach after the 2007 season and served as head coach in 2008.  He was controversially fired from this position in December 2008.  He returned to the University of Cincinnati as the Director of Player Services in 2009.  For the 2010 he will be an assistant coach at the University at Buffalo under former University of Cincinnati assistant coach and now UB head football Coach Jeff Quinn.

Jones is an alumnus of Alcorn State and a former wide receiver on the Braves' football team.  Prior to receiving the head coach position, Jones served as an assistant at Concordia University, Kentucky State University, Oberlin College, Central Michigan University and the University of Cincinnati.

Head coaching record

References

External links
 Morgan State profile

1970 births
Living people
American football wide receivers
Alcorn State Braves football coaches
Alcorn State Braves football players
Buffalo Bulls football coaches
Central Michigan Chippewas football coaches
Cincinnati Bearcats football coaches
Concordia Golden Bears football coaches
UConn Huskies football coaches
Kentucky State Thorobreds football coaches
Morgan State Bears football coaches
Oberlin Yeomen football coaches
Players of American football from Flint, Michigan
African-American coaches of American football
African-American players of American football
20th-century African-American sportspeople
21st-century African-American sportspeople